Matthew Wayne McCall (born December 12, 1981) is an American college basketball coach. He was most recently the head men's basketball coach at the University of Massachusetts Amherst (UMass).

Coaching career
McCall was a student manager at the University of Florida during the 2002–03 season. He was named head manager the following year.  After graduating, he continued working with the program, and in 2006 he was named director of basketball operations.  In 2008, he was hired as an assistant coach at Florida Atlantic. He held that position until 2011, when he was hired by the University of Florida as an assistant. McCall was hired by Chattanooga in April 2015 after Will Wade left to take the head coaching job at VCU. In March 2016, McCall was named the Southern Conference Basketball Coach of the Year. On March 30, 2017, he was introduced as the 22nd head coach in the history of UMass men's basketball. On March 1, 2022, McCall was fired by UMass, although he was allowed to coach the remainder of the season.

Personal life
McCall earned two degrees from Florida:  a bachelor's (2004) in exercise and sports science and a master's (2006) in secondary education. His father, Wayne, was a three-year letterwinner for the University of Florida football team from 1965–67.

Head coaching record

References

1981 births
Living people
American men's basketball coaches
College men's basketball head coaches in the United States
Chattanooga Mocs men's basketball coaches
Florida Atlantic Owls men's basketball coaches
Florida Gators men's basketball coaches
UMass Minutemen basketball coaches
University of Florida alumni